Romanian Socialist Party may refer to:
Romanian Socialist Party (present-day), formerly known as Socialist Alliance Party
Romanian Socialist Party (1992–2015)
Socialist Party of Romania